The mixed doubles curling tournament of the 2018 Winter Olympics was held at the Gangneung Curling Centre from 8 to 13 February 2018. Eight nations competed in a round robin preliminary round, and the top four nations at the conclusion of the round robin qualified for the medal round. This was the first time mixed doubles was held at the Winter Olympics.

On 18 February 2018, it was reported that bronze medallist Alexander Krushelnitskiy of the Olympic Athletes from Russia team had failed a drug test and was awaiting a test of the B sample. After the testing of the B sample that was also positive, the Court of Arbitration for Sport (CAS) confirmed that they were instituting formal proceedings; three days later, CAS disqualified the Olympic Athletes from Russia team and stripped them of the bronze medal, which was reawarded to the Norwegian team.

Teams
Teams have one male and one female thrower, with one curler throwing rocks #1 and #5 and the other throwing rocks #2, #3 and #4. Only the Olympic Athletes from Russia team have the female curler throwing the middle three rocks and the male curler throwing first and last. The remainder of the teams have the male curler throwing the middle three rocks and the female curler throwing first and last. Teams can change at any time.

Round-robin standings

Round-robin results
All draw times are listed in KST (UTC+9).

Summary

Draw 1
Thursday, 8 February, 9:05

Draw 2
Thursday, 8 February, 20:05

Draw 3
Friday, 9 February, 8:35

Draw 4
Friday, 9 February, 13:35

Draw 5
Saturday, 10 February, 9:05

Draw 6
Saturday, 10 February, 20:05

Draw 7
Sunday, 11 February, 9:05

Tiebreaker
Sunday, 11 February, 20:05

Playoffs

Notes
1  won the bronze medal match 8–4, but were disqualified due to the doping case mentioned above.

Semifinals
Monday, 12 February, 9:05

Monday, 12 February, 20:05

Bronze medal game
Tuesday, 13 February, 9:05

Notes
  (which won the bronze medal match 8–4) were disqualified after the tournament due to the doping case.

Gold medal game
Tuesday, 13 February, 20:05

Final standings
The final standings are:

Statistics

Player percentages 
Player percentages during round robin play are as follows:

Female

Male

Team total

References

mixed
Mixed events at the 2018 Winter Olympics
Mixed doubles curling